Izabella Yurieva is the stage name of Izabella Danilovna Livikova (7 September 1899 – 20 January 2000), a Russian singer nicknamed the "Queen of the Russian Romance" who celebrated her centennial at a tribute concert given in her honor at the Central Concert Hall in Moscow in 1999.

She was one of the top performers of the romantic Russian Gypsy songs in the late 1920s and 1930s before the genre became almost taboo in Soviet Russia.

Yurieva was largely forgotten until the 1990s when she resurfaced on television and was named a People's Artist of Russia.

See also 
7452 Izabelyuria, asteroid named after her

References

External links
Link to her CD

Russian centenarians
Musicians from Rostov-on-Don
Russian Jews
1899 births
2000 deaths
Soviet Jews
People's Artists of Russia
Pseudonymous artists
Soviet women singers
20th-century Russian women singers
20th-century Russian singers
Women centenarians